Vabs or VABS may refer to:

 Vafs, Markazi, a village in Markazi Province, Iran
 Waabs, a municipality in Schleswig-Holstein, Germany
 Vineland Adaptive Behaviour Scales, a measure of effectiveness in the Treatment and Education of Autistic and Related Communication Handicapped Children

See also
VAB (disambiguation)